The Cathedral of the Most Holy Trinity, St. Anthony of Padua and Our Lady of Assumption of Zipaquirá  also called Zipaquirá Cathedral is a cathedral church of Catholic worship dedicated  under the joint patronage of the Holy Trinity and St. Anthony of Padua. It is located on the north side of the Comuneros Square, in the historic center of the city of Zipaquirá (Cundinamarca) in the South American country of Colombia.

Description 
It is the main temple of the Roman Catholic Diocese of Zipaquirá. The temple is better known simply as Parish of the Most Holy Trinity, St. Anthony of Padua and Our Lady of Assumption  - Cathedral of Zipaquirá to distinguish it from the Salt Cathedral, which is located in the same municipality, this being actually a parish church and a tourist site and not a bishopric.

The cathedral was designed by the colonial Friar Domingo de Petrés (the same who designed the Primatial Cathedral of Bogotá, Cathedral of Santa Fé de Antioquia and the Cathedral of Facatativá), its construction began in 1805 and took 111 years to finalize, until it was inaugurated and consecrated on November 19, 1916 by the Archbishop of Bogotá, Bernardo Herrera Restrepo. The historic Zipaquirá sector (including the cathedral), was declared a National Monument of Colombia by resolution 002 of 12 March 1982.

Gallery

Gallery

See also 

 Roman Catholicism in Colombia
 Salt Cathedral of Zipaquirá

References 

Roman Catholic cathedrals in Colombia
Buildings and structures in Zipaquirá
Tourist attractions in Cundinamarca Department
Roman Catholic churches completed in 1916
20th-century Roman Catholic church buildings in Colombia